Thorpe Tilney is a hamlet in the civil parish of Timberland  in the district of North Kesteven, in the county of Lincolnshire, England. The hamlet is located directly south of Timberland, and stretches from Thorpe Tilney on the B1189 eastwards through Thorpe Tilney Fen to Thorpe Tilney Dales beside the River Witham. Thorpe Tilney was a civil parish between 1866 and 1931 when it was abolished to enlarge Timberland.

Locale

In 1545 three houses in Thorpe Tilney, a possession of the dissolved Kyme Priory, were granted to John Broxholme and John Bellowe. A farm on a slight hill east of the Car Dyke may represent the site, which is known locally as Priory Hill.

Evans Farmhouse, originally an inn on the then Billinghay to Metheringham road, is also a listed building, built of red brick and dating from 1782.

Thorpe Tilney Hall 
Thorpe Tilney Hall is a Grade II listed red brick country house dating from 1740 with later alterations and additions. Also listed are the Orangery and attached garden dating from 17th Century, and the stable block and cottage dating from 1740. This earlier Hall was struck by lightning and destroyed in 1705, and the Orangery and its associated walled garden relate to this earlier building, and are dated c. 1680.

The Hall was used by the Whichcote family as a dower house for their main seat, Aswarby Park, the other side of Sleaford, and one of their tombs can be seen in the adjacent Timberland church. The Whichcotes continued to own Thorpe Tilney, with a   estate, until 1918, when much of the land was bought by the County Council to provide small-holdings for returning soldiers. 

Latterly, Thorpe Tilney Hall was owned by the aristocratic Stockdale family who restored the building. Freddie Stockdale was a well regarded opera impresario, in 1977 he oversaw the construction of the Opera Pavilion to a design by Francis Johnson, with stained glass by John Piper in the grounds of the hall. At this time the Hall became well known for operatic performances.

Thorpe Tilney Hall was used as a filming location in two separate television productions of Pride and Prejudice, first in 1980 and then in 1995.

History
Neolithic axes made of stone and flint have been found around the village.

Later finds include a piece of Roman pottery, a Bronze Age barrow and a Bronze Age flanged bronze axe.

References

Hamlets in Lincolnshire
North Kesteven District